Roknabad (also Romanized as Roknābād; also known as Ruknābād and Zeknābād) is a village in Eshkanan Rural District, Eshkanan District, Lamerd County, Fars Province, Iran. At the 2006 census, its population was 777, in 160 families.

References 

Populated places in Lamerd County